Herbert Clay Dessauer (30 December 1921 – 8 February 2013) was an American biochemist, and a pioneer in the use of molecular systematics to clarify the evolutionary relationships of anole lineages. For most of his career Dessauer was a professor at Louisiana State University's Medical Center.

Notes

American biochemists
Louisiana State University faculty
1921 births
2013 deaths